Çınarlı, Çinarlı or Chenarli, a Turkic word meaning "place with plane trees", may refer to:

Çinarlı, Bilasuvar, Azerbaijan
Çinarlı, Khojavend, Azerbaijan
Çinarlı, Qakh, Azerbaijan
Çinarlı, Shamkir, Azerbaijan
Chenarli, Iran, Iran
Platani, Cyprus or Çınarlı, Northern Cyprus
Çınarlı, Çanakkale, Turkey
Çınarlı, Düzce
Çınarlı, Mudanya
Çınarlı, Mut, Mersin Province, Turkey
Çınarlı, Sason, Batman Province, Turkey
Çınarlı, Yüreğir, Adana Province, Turkey

See also
Chenar (disambiguation)
Çınar (disambiguation)